Jolibois is a French surname. Notable people with the surname include:

 Eugène Jolibois (1819–1896), French lawyer and politician
 Georgina Jolibois (born 1968), Canadian politician

French-language surnames